The Bug River Poles are Polish people who, either were, or are descendants of, inhabitants of the area of the Eastern Borderlands, an area to the east of modern borders of Poland, within the modern territory of Belarus, Lithuania, Ukraine, that were displaced from there to Poland between 1944 and 1959.

Name 
The name refers to the Bug River, a major river mostly located in Eastern Europe, which now makes the portion of the Eastern border of Poland with Belarus and Ukraine. In Polish the name is Zabużanie (singular: Zabużanin), which literally means the people from the other side of Bug River. It refers to the fact that people to whom that name applies, used to live to the east of that river.

History  

The Borderlands Poles are the collection of the ethnographic groups of Polish people from the area of the Eastern Borderlands, an area to the east of modern borders of Poland, within the modern territory of Belarus, Lithuania, Ukraine. They are mostly descendants of Masovians, and to lesser extend, Lesser Poland people, who colonized the area across centuries.

In the aftermath of World War II, thousands of Polish people were displaced from the Soviet Union to Poland, mostly in the first repatriation of 1944–1946, and later in the second repatriation of 1955–1959. As such, they, and their descendants, now live across Poland.

Many of those who were forced to leave, had to leave their property behind, including land, vehicles, and others. It is referred to as Bug River property, and Poland is currently paying the portion of the recompensation to them, and their descendants. Currently, the term Bug River Poles is popularly used to refer to those who are eligible to receive such recompensation.

Notes

References 

Lechites
Polish people
Slavic ethnic groups
Ethnic groups in Poland
Poland in World War II
Belarus–Poland relations
Lithuania–Poland relations
Poland–Ukraine relations
Stalinism in Poland
Polish People's Republic